Éire Nua, or "New Ireland", was a proposal supported by the Provisional IRA and Sinn Féin during the 1970s and early 1980s for a federal United Ireland. The proposal was particularly associated with the Dublin-based leadership group centred on Ruairí Ó Brádaigh and Dáithí Ó Conaill, who were the authors of the policy.

Éire Nua is still supported by the Continuity IRA, Republican Sinn Féin, Na Fianna Éireann and Cumann na mBan.

Ideology
Éire Nua envisaged an all-Ireland republic that would be created when the British withdrew from Northern Ireland. It also involved the dissolution of the existing Republic of Ireland, which many republicans considered an illegitimate entity imposed by the British in 1922. Under Éire Nua, Ireland would become a federal state with parliaments for each of its four historic provinces, as well as a central parliament based in Athlone.

The purpose of the federal structure was twofold. Firstly, it was intended to show unionists in Northern Ireland that they would have some kind of self-government in a united Ireland. This would be achieved by the provision of a parliament, Dáil Uladh, for Ulster. However, by including all of historic Ulster—nine counties instead of the six in Northern Ireland—it was intended that the unionist majority would be slim enough to prevent abuses against the Catholic/nationalist population in the province.

Secondly, the federal parliaments were intended to redress the economic imbalance between the eastern and western parts of Ireland, and was hoped to enable prosperity in the poorer west of the country.

Irish reactions and decline in popularity
Many members of Sinn Féin, particularly in Northern Ireland, objected to Éire Nua on the grounds that it would perpetuate the dominance of Protestant unionists in the north of the country. Despite this, Éire Nua committees were established at least in Ulster and Connacht, largely due to the efforts of Desmond Fennell and Emmett O'Connell. Nevertheless, the scheme was dismissed as unworkable by some influential Republicans. When Northern Republicans grouped around Gerry Adams gained control of the IRA and Sinn Féin in the late 1970s, they attacked the policy. In 1982, the Sinn Féin Ard Fheis voted to drop the policy, and the following year all reference to it in the Sinn Féin Constitution and rules was removed, and it was removed as the policy of the Republican movement in favour of the creation of a unitary Irish Republic.

Ó Brádaigh and his supporters walked out of the 1986 Ard Fheis after a motion was passed that ended the Republican policy of abstentionism to the Oireachtas and reconvened the Ard Fheis at the West County Hotel in the village of Chapelizod just west of Dublin. Henceforth referring to itself as Republican Sinn Féin to distinguish itself from former associates, the party still advocates the Éire Nua agenda.

Foreign reactions

United Kingdom

United States
The reaction of the US administration to Éire Nua was mixed.  Due in large part to Irish-American pressure at home, a synopsis of Éire Nua was entered into the Congressional Record as a solution that "merits consideration" to the crisis in Ireland. Officials in Ireland were less optimistic, placing more hope in the Sunningdale Agreement.  Ambassador John Moore did note, however: "In long term, some sort of federated Ireland seems a real possibility, but path to it seems more likely to be the pragmatic Sunningdale route than the dramatic one advocated by Boal and the Provos."

See also
Home Rule All Round

References

External links
The Irish Left Archive: Provisional Sinn Féin, Éire Nua Document January 1971 Cedar Lounge Revolution review of  the document (with PDF).
1979 Version of Éire Nua
2011 Version of Éire Nua
 Cumann na Saoirse Náısıúnta Éire Nua Committee

1970s in Ireland
Constitutional amendments
Continuity Irish Republican Movement
Federalism by country
Irish republicanism
National unifications
Northern Ireland peace process
Political schisms
Politics of Ireland
Proposed countries
Provisional Irish Republican Army
Sinn Féin